The 143rd Pennsylvania House of Representatives District is located in Southeastern Pennsylvania and has been represented since 2020 by Shelby Labs.

District profile
The 143rd Pennsylvania House of Representatives District is located in Bucks County. It includes the Stover-Myers Mill. It is made up of the following areas:

 Bedminster Township
 Bridgeton Township
 Buckingham Township (PART, District
Upper [PART, Divisions 01 and 03])
 Doylestown
 Doylestown Township
 Durham Township
 Haycock Township
 Nockamixon Township
 Plumstead Township
 Riegelsville
 Tinicum Township

Representatives

Recent election results

References

External links
District map from the United States Census Bureau
Pennsylvania House Legislative District Maps from the Pennsylvania Redistricting Commission.  
Population Data for District 143 from the Pennsylvania Redistricting Commission.

143
Government of Bucks County, Pennsylvania